Ark St Alban's Academy is a mixed secondary school and sixth form located in the Highgate area of Birmingham, West Midlands, England.

Previously administered by Birmingham City Council, the school converted to academy status on 1 September 2009. Ark St Alban's Academy is sponsored by Ark and the Church of England Diocese of Birmingham. The school also maintains links with the Parish of St Alban the Martyr, Birmingham.

Ark St Alban's Academy offers GCSEs and Cambridge Nationals as programmes of study for pupils, while students in the sixth form (which opened in 2013) have the option to study from a range of A-levels. The school also has specialisms in mathematics and engineering.

History 
The original school was founded in 1871 by brothers, James and Thomas Pollock, Christian missionaries in the Anglo-Catholic tradition from the Isle of Man. The new school opened in 2009.

References

External links
Ark St Alban's Academy official website

Secondary schools in Birmingham, West Midlands
Church of England secondary schools in the Diocese of Birmingham
Academies in Birmingham, West Midlands
Ark schools